Six ships of the United States Navy have been named Advance.

 – a brigantine used for an arctic rescue expedition
 – also known as Frolic was a former Confederate blockade runner captured and used as a gunboat
 – an 
 – an

Sources
 

United States Navy ship names